Maria Jones may refer to:

Maria Jones, character in Lovesick (TV series)
Maria Jones, fictional accomplice of Kay Harker

See also

Mariah Jones, fictional character
Marie Jones